Chase Litton (born October 5, 1995) is an American football quarterback for the Calgary Stampeders of the Canadian Football League (CFL). He played college football at Marshall University. He was signed by the Kansas City Chiefs as an undrafted free agent in 2018.

Early years
Litton attended Wharton High School in Tampa, Florida. As a senior in 2013, he threw for nearly 2,200 yards and 13 touchdowns. He originally committed to play football for the USF Bulls, but decomitted before his senior year. He then did not sign with any school on 2014 National Signing Day and announced that he would be attending a prep school and that he would reclassify into the class of 2015. However, Litton chose not to attend prep school and instead committed to play football for the Marshall Thundering Herd as a class of 2014 recruit.

College career
As a freshman in 2015, Litton was not originally the Thundering Herd's starting quarterback, but took over the starting role in the third game of the season. In 11 games, Litton threw for 2,605 yards and 23 touchdowns, a Marshall freshman record.

In 2016, as a sophomore, Litton started ten games at quarterback, missing two games due to both injury and suspension. He threw for 2,612 yards and 24 touchdowns against nine interceptions.

As a junior in 2017, Litton started all 13 of Marshall's games, completing 266 of 443 passes for 3,115 yards and 25 touchdowns. After the season, Litton declared for the 2018 NFL Draft.

Professional career

Kansas City Chiefs
After going undrafted in the 2018 NFL Draft, Litton signed with the Kansas City Chiefs as an undrafted free agent on May 5, 2018. He was waived on September 1, 2018 and was signed to the practice squad the next day. He signed a reserve/future contract with the Chiefs on January 23, 2019. On August 31, 2019, Litton was waived as part of final roster cuts.

Jacksonville Jaguars
On September 2, 2019, Litton was signed to the Jacksonville Jaguars' practice squad. He was released on October 21, 2019.

Seattle Dragons
Litton was allocated to the Seattle Dragons before the 2020 XFL Supplemental Draft on November 22, 2019.

Tampa Bay Vipers
Litton was traded to the Tampa Bay Vipers on January 19, 2020. He was waived on March 6, 2020.

Ottawa Redblacks
Litton signed with the Ottawa Redblacks of the CFL on March 11, 2021. He was released on July 10, 2021.

Winnipeg Blue Bombers
On May 1, 2022 the Winnipeg Blue Bombers announced they had signed Litton. He was released on June 18, 2022.

Calgary Stampeders
On November 22, 2022, Litton signed with the Calgary Stampeders of the Canadian Football League (CFL).

References

External links
Marshall bio

1995 births
Living people
Players of American football from Tampa, Florida
Players of Canadian football from Tampa, Florida
American football quarterbacks
Marshall Thundering Herd football players
Kansas City Chiefs players
Jacksonville Jaguars players
Seattle Dragons players
Tampa Bay Vipers players
Ottawa Redblacks players